The Certified Automotive Parts Association (CAPA) is a non-profit organization established in 1987 and based in Washington, D.C., United States, to develop and oversee a test program guaranteeing the suitability and quality of automotive parts.  CAPA was created by automobile insurance companies. It was created to control the market on parts used by insurance company contracted collision shops.  It gave the insurance companies an alternative to high priced OEM parts. CAPA encourages competition in the marketplace in the hope that their program will ultimately reduce expense to the consumer and the industry while increasing and assuring part quality.

Material Standards 

CAPA quality standards apply to various types of parts made from different materials. CAPA is constantly expanding the certification program to include more parts and new materials. Currently, three specifications that set quality standards for metal (CAPA 101), plastic (CAPA 201) and lighting (CAPA 301) are in place. Each specification provides detailed testing and inspection procedures to ensure the quality of the parts covered by that specification. Where possible, all test procedures refer to the nationally recognized tests such as those of ASTM and SAE.

Metals (CAPA 101) 
Metal parts that are primed, decoratively painted, plated with metallic coatings, or painted and plated with metallic coatings are covered, including:

Bezels
Deck lids
 Door shells
 Fenders
 Grilles
 Hoods
 Pickup beds
 Pickup box sides
Quarter panels
 Radiator supports
 Wheel houses
 Tailgates

Plastics (CAPA 201) 
Plastic parts that are unprimed, primed, decoratively painted, plated with metallic coatings, or painted and plated with metallic coatings are covered, including:

Bezels
Bumper Covers
Fenders
Fascia, Front/Rear
Grilles
Header Panels
Hoods
Side mouldings

The CAPA 201 specifications include requirements for:

Adhesive integrity
Appearance
Assembly requirements
Coating performance
Dimensional Checks
Fasteners
Hardware
Materials analysis (composition, mechanical properties)
Production requirements
Quality control procedures
New Part Approval Vehicle Test Fit (VTF), as applicable

Lighting (CAPA 301) 
CAPA 301 for Lighting was approved by the CAPA Technical Committee in March 2002. Automotive lighting parts are covered, including:
Headlamps
Tail lamps
Automotive lighting
High-Mounted
Brake lights

The CAPA 301 specifications include requirements for:
FMVSS 108 Compliance, Initial and Ongoing
Dimensional Verification
Physical Dimensions and Effective Projected Luminous Lens Area
Electrical and Power
Illumination, Photometry, and Color
Life and Durability Requirements
Gaskets, Adhesives, Sealants, and Auxiliary Equipment
Aiming Devices
Metallurgical/Material Analyses (composition, mechanical properties)
Appearance
Production
Quality Control Procedures
New Part Approval Vehicle Test Fit (VTF)

See also 
 National Automotive Parts Association

References

External links 
 CAPA Official site

Non-profit organizations based in Washington, D.C.